Buesnel is a surname. Notable people with the surname include:

Alex Buesnel (born 1992), British artistic gymnast
Tony Buesnel, Australian former football coach